Opening Ceremony  is a fashion brand founded in 2002  by fashion designers Carol Lim and Humberto Leon. The brand designs and creates its own products and also  retails other emerging fashion labels. Opening Ceremony is known for exotic runway shows and advocating global issues. During the COVID-19 pandemic the company announced it would close all its physical stores due to bankruptcy.

History 
Carol Lim was inspired in Hong Kong and to open her own fashion line Opening Ceremony in New York in September 2002. The Tokyo store, located in Shibuya, was ranked by American magazine Complex as the 4th best store in the world in 2013.

Opening Ceremony has collaborated with Spike Jonze, Terence Koh, Yoko Ono, Justin Peck, Chloë Sevigny and the New York City Ballet.

On January 13, 2020, the company was acquired by New Guards Group, a cartel that owns Off-White and other well-known streetwear brands. On January 14, Lim and Leon announced that the company's retail stores would be closing at some point in the year.

Ready-To-Wear Spring 2016 Collection 

In 2015, Opening Ceremony held its Ready-to-wear Spring 2016 fashion show in a live garden to showcase their upcoming assortment of outfits. Instead of models walking down the runway as usual, they purposely collapsed to the ground and rose up into a contemporary dance choreographed by Justin Peck, resident choreographer for the New York City Ballet.

With an overarching theme of ballet, architecture and exotic travel away from home, the collection included Asian Bonsai tree embroidery, African textiles, khaki cargo pants and dresses, and Moorish arches inspired structural silhouettes.

Ready-to-wear collections, as the name suggests, encompass clothes that are immediately ready to be sold in a store. Unlike bespoke clothing, these clothes are produced in standard sizes that fit most people and require little to no alterations.

Fall 2017 Collection 

For their Fall 2017 collection, the runway show incorporated an original dance piece that outlined the timeline of couples’ romantic relationships. The artistic vision was directed by Humberto Leon’s close friend Spike Jonze and choreographed by Ryan Heffington. Actors and actresses dressed in Opening Ceremony’s Fall collection, guided the audience through the ups and downs of monogamy.

The collection progresses throughout the dance piece, with the timeline of the couple’s journey. A formal black and white dress for when the couple first starts dating to, conservative and baggy clothes when there is emotional mishap between the couple.

Fall collections are showcased during February and March internationally. They persist of clothes that are suitable for the Autumn and Winter seasons- coats, knits, etc.

Spring 2018 Collection 

The collection was presented after-hours at Disneyland’s Toon Town. In honour of Mickey Mouse’s 90th birthday, Lim and Leon collaborated with Disney products to showcase a festive and vibrant collection, featuring a marching band and runway walks by Mickey and Minnie Mouse.

Drawing from all the latest trends, the designers presented a range of crafty knitwear, sporty graphics, prairie dresses and carpenter pants infused with enlarged and repeated prints of Mickey.

Spring 2019 Collection 

Held at Le Poisson Rouge was one of Opening Ceremony’s most eccentric shows, ‘The Gift of Showz’. A drag spectacle featuring renowned drag queens: Sasha Velour, Shea Couleé, West Dakota, Lypsinka and 40 others. The show finale was opened by Christina Aguilera accompanied by other drag queens and a festive atmosphere. The brand hosted a fashion show uncommon in the fashion industry in hopes to represent different genders and sexual preferences.

Leon and Lim merged their own experience on vacations, to imitate a fantastical journey for their Spring 2019 clothing. A repetition of flowy summer frocks and funky floral prints, toned down with all-black outfits are observed.

Spring collections are showcased in September and consist of clothes like dresses, skirts and shorts.

Asian Culture 
For their 2019 February fashion look-book, the co-founders recognised their Asian heritage and culture, by recruiting Asian-American pioneers as their muses.

Leon and Lim, both of Asian descent, were inspired by their own and others' journeys of succeeding in an environment where Asians are a minority. The look-book features different Asian pioneers from a range of industries, like the music and culinary industry. Musician and composer Ryuichi Sakamoto, chef Angela Dimayuga, and designer Anna Sui were of the few featured.

The Opening Ceremony designers aimed to spread a positive message of inclusivity in the fashion industry and recognition to all the Asian creatives working to solidify their own identity in a space where they are not fully represented.

Collaboration 

In 2010, the brand collaborated with Maison Margiela, a French luxury fashion house. This collaboration was Maison Margiela's first co-branded project in its history. The product outcome was a white Bic pen with the classic Maison Margiela labelling and a plume. The two brands decided to further collaborate in 2011 and designed a whole womenswear line for Margiela's MM6 label.

In 2017, Opening Ceremony teamed up with the New York City Ballet. Dressed in the brand's casual attire, ballerinasperformed their new ballet ‘The Times Are Racing’. The collaboration between the two companies was to portray the juxtaposition between the collectedness of ballet and free-lived expression of people on the streets.

Also in 2017, Esprit] and Opening Ceremony came together to create a collection of clothes that advocated for both brands’ values towards family and unity. For their model line-up, the brand cast sons and daughters of famous figures like Kim Gordon and Mario Sorrenti.

An unexpected collaboration was in 2018 with Crosby studios, a Moscow-based design studio. In lieu of New York Design week, Opening Ceremony and the design studio merged contemporary with playful aesthetics to create a collection of tables, chairs and other small furniture pieces in a monochromatic royal purple colour.

Creative Directors for Kenzo 

In 2011, Lim became the creative director of the brand Kenzo, owned by the multinational corporation, LVMH.

After collaborations with multiple brands, the two designers wanted to work further with individual brands, as they thought they could "affect the bigger business." Everyone turned them down except brand Kenzo.

The designers prepared and presented a pitch in a short amount of time. Their pitch focused on specific alternations of the brand if the two had authoritative power. From the Kenzo experience, aesthetics, interior design of stores to marketing strategies, the duo's attention to detail and long-term vision gave them their new position as the creative directors of Kenzo.

In 2019, Leon and Lim were removed from their positions as co-creative directors at Kenzo. Their last show was on June 23 for Kenzo's 2020 Spring collection.

Retail Brands 
Opening Ceremony was one of the first retail shops to carry Havaianas and Topshop products. They introduced both, now globally known, brands into the US market. Designer brand, Alexander Wang, has also been selling his products through Opening Ceremony since 2007, along with famous Japanese brand Comme Des Garcons, Proenza Schouler and Rodarte.

The cofounders believed that a person willing to buy expensive or designer garments would also be willing to buy cheap t-shirts, socks and random art pieces.

Sales and Advertising 
Through curating their retail stores with multiple brands, Opening Ceremony formed relationships with many designers and put their name out into the industry, Opening Ceremony has been able to advertise their practice and products from loud statements about politics, cultures and people.

In popular culture 
A list of famous celebrities have attended Opening Ceremony's shows and have been spotted wearing Opening Ceremony's attire.

American actor Jonah Hill wrote the one-act play Lost Cotton for Opening Ceremony's Spring 2015 Collection. In 2017, Spike Jonze wrote and directed "Changers", a dance performance that starred Lakeith Stanfield and Mia Wasikowska at La MaMa Experimental Theatre Club.

In 2016, Drake wore the bright orange hoodie and sweatpants from the Opening Ceremony x Esprit collection.

Troye Sivan and Nicki Minaj along with other LGBTQIA+ models were in attendance at the brand's Spring 2019 drag inspired fashion show.

Recent 
In 2020, online retailer Farfetch’s New Guards Group purchased Opening Ceremony and will be taking over the brand. With 18 years of history in the retail market, the brand has decided to close all their physical stores around the world. A huge factor that played into this decision was the rapid change in consumer behaviour and shopping habits.

See also 
 Kenzo

References

External links 
 

Clothing brands of the United States
Clothing companies established in 2002
Clothing companies disestablished in 2020
Street fashion
2002 establishments in New York City
2020 disestablishments in New York (state)